Diatraea argentina is a moth in the family Crambidae. It was described by Harold Edmund Box in 1931. It is found in Argentina.

References

Chiloini
Moths of South America
Endemic fauna of Argentina
Moths described in 1931